Ronald Tavel (May 17, 1936 – March 23, 2009) was an American screenwriter, director, novelist, poet and actor, best known for his work with Andy Warhol and The Factory.

Early life and career
Born in Brooklyn, New York, Tavel graduated from Brooklyn College and later attended the University of Wyoming, where he earned a Master's degree in creative writing in 1959. Tavel worked as a screenwriter during the 1960s for many of Andy Warhol's underground films including Chelsea Girls. Tavel worked with other members of Warhol's Factory crowd, including Freddie Herko, Ondine, Mary Woronov, Billy Name, and Brigid Berlin.  He also received the Obie Award for Outstanding Contribution to Theater in 1969, for the musical drama Boy On the Straight-Back Chair.

Tavel later founded, named, and was heavily involved with the Playhouse of the Ridiculous, a New York City theatre presenting works produced and directed by John Vaccaro, Harvey Tavel, and Charles Ludlam. Tavel provided the one-sentence manifesto for The Theatre of the Ridiculous: "We have passed beyond the Absurd: our position is absolutely preposterous."

In 1975, Tavel was appointed Artist-in-Residence to The Yale University Divinity School for his contributions to formal theology and religious theatre (notably, the Obie-Award-winning play Bigfoot). In 1977, he was re-appointed to that position for the three-act play Gazelle Boy.

In 1980, he was appointed the First Playwright-in-Residence at Cornell University where he was commissioned to write the melodrama, The Understudy, directed and designed by Michael Hillyer, which starred a young Jimmy Smits. In 1986, Tavel was appointed Distinguished Visiting Assistant Professor in Creative Writing at The University of Colorado at Boulder.

Death
On March 23, 2009, Tavel died of a heart attack on a flight from Berlin to Bangkok at the age of 73. Tavel had lived in Bangkok for twelve years.

Selected works
 Chelsea Girls (1966)
 Hedy (1966)
 Kitchen (1965)
 The Life of Juanita Castro (1965) as the Stage Manager and on-screen director
 Poor Little Rich Girl (1965)
 Horse (1965) as Illuminary
 Space (1965)
 Screen Test #1 (1965) as off-screen interrogator
 Screen Test #2 (1965) as off-screen interrogator
 Vinyl (1965)
 Harlot (1964)
 Street of Stairs (1968 novel)

References

External links
 Official website
 

1941 births
2009 deaths
20th-century American dramatists and playwrights
American expatriates in Thailand
American male film actors
American male screenwriters
Brooklyn College alumni
Writers from Brooklyn
American people of German descent
University of Wyoming alumni
American male dramatists and playwrights
20th-century American male writers
Screenwriters from New York (state)
20th-century American male actors
20th-century American screenwriters